Life, and Another is the sixth record by avant-pop musician Erin Birgy, under the moniker of Mega Bog. It was released by Paradise of Bachelors in July 2021. The record features co-production help from James Krivchenia, the drummer for folk rock quartet Big Thief.

Background
Life, and Another was recorded at the Unknown studio in Anacortes, Washington, from 2019. The album is influenced in part by the artist David Wojnarowicz's audio journals, transcriptions of which were published as Weight of the Earth.

Critical reception
 
Life, and Another has been welcomed with mostly positive reviews. On Metacritic, it has a score of 81 out of 100, indicating "universal acclaim", based on six reviews. Sophie Kemp for Pitchfork gave it a glowing review, calling it "delightfully freaky".

References

2021 albums
Folk-pop albums